Gibbosporina acuminata is a species of foliose lichen in the family Pannariaceae. It was described as a new species in 2016 by Norwegian lichenologist Arve Elvebakk. The specific epithet, derived from the Latin acumen ("sharp point"), refers to the spiked bumps (gibbae) on the spore covering (perispore). It occurs in the tropical forests of Queensland, Australia, and the Philippines.

References

acuminata
Lichen species
Lichens of Asia
Lichens of Australia
Lichens described in 2016
Taxa named by Arve Elvebakk